Until My Voice Is Gone is the first live album from Travis Ryan. Integrity Music released the album on May 13, 2016.

Critical reception

 
Awarding the album four stars at Today's Christian Entertainment, Laura Chambers describes, "Until My Voice Is Gone instead loans us the skillful words of another, borrowed in turn from the pages of Scripture; a poignant reminder that every moment belongs to God, yet we could never have enough of them to give Him His due." Madeleine Dittmer, rating the album four stars by The Christian Beat, writes, "The tracks range from energetic praise to simple, but powerful songs of gratitude...Travis Ryan’s songs are beautiful, authentic songs of worship to add to your collection." Giving the album four stars from 365 Days of Inspiring Media, Joshua Andre states, "Well done Travis for a compelling, hard hitting, necessary and also hopeful album".

Track listing

Chart performance

References

2016 live albums